Opatov is a Prague Metro station on Line C, serving Jižní Město. The station was formerly known as Družby. It was opened on 7 November 1980 as part of the extension from Kačerov to Kosmonautů (currently Háje).

References

Prague Metro stations
Railway stations opened in 1980
1980 establishments in Czechoslovakia
Chodov (Prague)
Railway stations in the Czech Republic opened in the 20th century